Ebrahim "Biboy" Lopez Enguio (born January 31, 1988) is a Filipino-Indonesian professional basketball player who plays for the Louvre Indonesia of the ASEAN Basketball League (ABL). He played college basketball for the UE Red Warriors in the University Athletic Association of the Philippines (UAAP).

Early life
Ebrahim Lopez Enguio was born on January 31, 1988, in Alabang, Muntinlupa, Philippines. He is of Filipino and Indonesian descent. His father, a Manado-native is an Indonesian citizen while his mother is of native Filipino descent.

College career
As the youngest of six children, he claimed that his uncle taught him how to play basketball. Enguio's basketball career began at age 13 when he was in high school and played for a school team in Manila. It was then continued until he went to college and played for the University of the East Red Warriors in the University Athletic Association of the Philippines (UAAP).

Amateur career
After his college career in the UAAP, Enguio played in the PBA Developmental League with the Cobra Energy Drink Iron Men and Boracay Rhum Waves (now Tanduay Light Rhum Masters) before moving to Indonesia.

Professional career

NBL Indonesia

Aspac Jakarta
Enguio debuted in NBL Indonesia (currently Indonesian Basketball League) with Aspac Jakarta. At that time, he was predicted to be one of the best rookies in the league besides Ramot Gemilang who played for Satya Wancana. Enguio has been known to dunk in games. He did it for the first time at the Solo Series III while he dunked in the Series IV three times. In Series IV Bandung, he did an alley-oop dunk twice which was very rare in basketball games in Indonesia. In one of his games as a rookie, he recorded a double-double with 31 points, 10 rebounds, 1 assist and 3 blocks.

Return to the PBA D-League

Tanduay Light Rhum Masters
Enguio signed with the PBA Developmental League team Tanduay Light Rhum Masters for the 2016 Foundation Cup.

Marinerong Pilipino
Enguio signed with the team Marinerong Pilipino for the 2017 Foundation Cup.

International career
As an Indonesian passport holder, Enguio is eligible and represents Indonesia in international basketball and in 2017, Enguio acquired Indonesian citizenship. He was part of the Indonesian squad the garnered second place at the 2015 Southeast Asian Games. In 2017, Enguio joined the training camp for the Indonesia national basketball team for the 2017 Southeast Asian Games. He also represented Indonesia in 3x3 basketball, playing in the 2018 FIBA 3x3 World Cup.

Career statistics

Regular season

Playoffs

References

1988 births
Living people
Basketball players from Metro Manila
Filipino people of Indonesian descent
Indonesian men's basketball players
Indonesian people of Filipino descent
People from Muntinlupa
Point guards
Shooting guards
Southeast Asian Games medalists in basketball
Southeast Asian Games silver medalists for Indonesia
UE Red Warriors basketball players
Competitors at the 2015 Southeast Asian Games
Competitors at the 2017 Southeast Asian Games
Maharlika Pilipinas Basketball League players
Blackwater Bossing draft picks